Lunar Sample 15555, better known as "Great Scott", is a lunar sample discovered and collected on the Apollo 15 mission in 1971 in the Hadley-Apennine region of the Moon. The rock is a  olivine-normative basalt.  It is named after mission commander David Scott, and it is the largest sample returned to Earth from the mission, as well as the most intensively studied.  It was collected by Scott on the rim of Hadley Rille, at station 9A.

Great Scott is currently stored at the Lunar Sample Laboratory Facility at the Lyndon B. Johnson Space Center.  Pieces of it is on display at the National Museum of Natural History in Washington, DC, the Franklin Institute in Philadelphia, the Tellus Science Museum in the state Georgia, the Madrid Deep Space Communications Complex in Spain, the LROC Lunar Exploration Museum at Arizona State University and the Science Museum in London, England.

The term Great Scott was in use as soon as the next mission, Apollo 16, because Charlie Duke used the term just before picking up Big Muley.  Big Muley is the largest sample (11.7 kg) returned from the Moon, and Great Scott is the second largest.

Description

Lunar sample 15555 is a coarse-grained, porphyritic rock with rounded olivine phenocrysts (1 mm) and subhedral zoned pyroxene phenocrysts (0.5–2 mm) set in a matrix of poikilitic plagioclase (up to 3 mm).

See also
 Big Bertha
 Big Muley

References

Lunar science
Lunar samples
Apollo 15
David Scott
Basalt